Mimaland is an abandoned recreation water theme park in Gombak, Selangor, Malaysia. Regarded as Malaysia's first theme park, it opened in 1975 and closed down permanently in May 1994, after a landslide damaged the property.

The entrance gate and remains of Mimaland still exist today.

History
Mimaland started operating in 1975. The name Mimaland is actually an acronym of the word combination Malaysia In Miniature Land. It was owned by Mimaland Berhad, a member of Magnum Group of Companies (now Magnum Corporation).

Mimaland's construction was done in phases and the theme park was opened in stages. Mimaland's first phase was completed in 1970, and consisted of 24 motels, 5 chalets and a swimming pool.

Among the main attractions, was the 'prehistoric animal park' containing dinosaur models of a very impressive size. Additionally, Mimaland also had a lake for boating and fishing activities, a 'giant maze', as well as a cross-forest area.

In January 1993, a 27-year-old Singaporean was killed while using the giant slide at the Mimaland pool. The incident shocked the public and resulted in a temporary closure of Mimaland. After improvement was done to the giant slide, Mimaland was reopened. However, a minor landslide caused damage to the walls of the same pool in May 1994. This incident caused muddy water to seep into the pool, causing the area to close to the public.

Several parties, including government agencies, took the management of Mimaland to court on a number of offenses, among which were security control issues. As a result, the court barred Mimaland from continuing its operations. Mimaland was closed permanently in 1994. Mimaland relics still exist to this day.

References

Parks in Malaysia
Defunct amusement parks in Malaysia
1970 establishments in Malaysia
1994 disestablishments in Malaysia
Amusement parks opened in 1975
Amusement parks closed in 1994